Mendeed was a Scottish heavy metal band formed in Dumbarton, in 2000 and disbanded in 2007.

History
The band's members met at school in Dumbarton. In 2002 they self-released their first EP Killing Something Beautiful. In 2003 the band released their second EP As We Rise.

In December 2003 Mendeed signed a recording contract with UK Label Rising Records. The band's first release on that label was an EP From Shadows Came Darkness in September 2004. It was produced by Mark Daghorn. Mendeed's music was played on rock radio stations. The band toured, supporting DragonForce twice.

In December 2004 the video Ignite the Flames was added to the playlists of MTV2 shows Headbangers Ball and 120 Minutes, and the catalogue of Scuzz TV.

Mendeed released their first album This War Will Last Forever in 2005 on Rising Records. In 2006 the album was released again by Nuclear Blast, at which point Mendeed were nominated for "Best Newcomer" at both the Kerrang and Metal Hammer Awards. The band also contributed to Kerrang's Remastered: Master of Puppets Revisited album, covering Metallica's song "The Thing That Should Not Be". This earned them a Gold Disc at the Kerrang Awards in 2006.

Mendeed toured with such names as Anthrax, Cradle of Filth, Napalm Death, Fear Factory and played dates with Avenged Sevenfold, Slipknot, Skindred, Bleeding Through and Trivium.  They also headlined their own tour in between dates supporting other bands, and performed on the Gibson/MySpace Stage at Download in 2006.

Their second album The Dead Live By Love was released in February 2007 debuting at no.4 in the British Rock charts. The band split up in 2007. After the split, lead guitarist Steve Nixon joined the Welsh Metalcore band Anterior.

Band members

Final lineup
Dave Proctor – vocals (2000–2007)
Steve Nixon – lead guitar (2000–2007)
Steph Gildea – rhythm guitar (2000–2007)
Chris Lavery – bass (2000–2007)
Kevin Matthews - drums (2000-2007)

Discography

Albums

EPs

Singles

Other
"The Thing That Should Not Be" (Metallica Cover)

To celebrate the 20th anniversary of Metallica's Master of Puppets album in August 2006, Kerrang magazine selected Mendeed to contribute to a tribute album. They opted to record "The Thing That Should Not Be". The CD, titled Remastered: Master of Puppets Revisited, was given away free with the magazine. Other artists selected to cover songs on the album were Machine Head, Trivium, Bullet for My Valentine, Chimaira, Fightstar, Mastodon and Funeral for a Friend.

References

External links
 Mendeed's MySpace
 Kevin Matthews Official myspace

Scottish metalcore musical groups
Scottish death metal musical groups
Musical groups established in 2000
Musical groups disestablished in 2007
Musical quintets
Nuclear Blast artists